Agonopterix pulvipennella is a moth of the family Depressariidae. It is found in North America, where it has been recorded from Quebec and New Brunswick to North Carolina, west to Colorado and north to Saskatchewan.

The wingspan is 16–21 mm. The forewings are light tan, mottled with dark brown and greyish brown. There is a dark brown blotch near the middle of the wing, with a white dot on the lower edge and dark diagonal dashes along the upper edge next to the costa. The orbicular spot has the form of a small pale patch and there are three or four dark oblong wedges which represent the subterminal line. The terminal line consists of a series of dark dots. The hindwings are greyish brown. Adults are on wing from  February through October in one generation per year.

The larvae feed on the leaves of Solidago and Urtica species. The species overwinters as an adult.

References

Moths described in 1864
Agonopterix
Moths of North America